Coast was a station on the Port Authority of Allegheny County's light rail network, located in the Beechview neighborhood of Pittsburgh, Pennsylvania. The street level stop was located on a small island platform in the middle of Broadway Avenue, through which The T traveled along former streetcar tracks. The station served a densely populated residential area through which bus service was limited because of the hilly terrain.

Coast was one of eleven stops closed on June 25, 2012 as part of a system-wide consolidation effort.

References

External links 

Port Authority T Stations Listings

Former Port Authority of Allegheny County stations
Railway stations in the United States opened in 1987
Railway stations closed in 2012